The Dr. Everett Chalmers Regional Hospital is a Canadian hospital in Fredericton, New Brunswick.

Dr. Everett Chalmers Regional Hospital operates as a tertiary care referral hospital with specialization in reconstructive and restorative medicine and is a leading plastic surgery centre.

Operated by Horizon Health Network, formerly by the River Valley Health Authority, the Dr. Everett Chalmers Regional Hospital opened in 1976, replacing the Victoria Public Hospital.  It is named in honour of George Everett Chalmers and was modelled after the McMaster University Medical Centre in Hamilton, Ontario.

In 2006 the Stan Cassidy Centre for Rehabilitation was relocated to a newly constructed building on the Dr. Everett Chalmers Regional Hospital campus, immediately south of, and connected to, the primary hospital building.

The Dr. Everett Chalmers Regional Hospital is also a teaching hospital for the Faculty of Medicine at Dalhousie University in Halifax, Nova Scotia.

Services
 Addictions and Mental Health
 Clinical Services
 Dermatology
 Day Surgery
 Dialysis (Nephrology)
 Ear, Nose & Throat (Otolaryngology)
 Emergency Department
 Family Medicine
 General Surgery
 Gynecology Surgery
 Gastroenterology
 Geriatrics / Restorative Care
 Intensive Care Unit (ICU)
 Internal Medicine
 Neonatal Intensive Care Unit (NICU)
 Minor Surgery
 Pediatrics
 Palliative Care
 Physiatry
 Psychiatry
 Obstetrics
 Ophthalmology (Eye) Surgery
 Orthopedic Surgery
 Plastic Surgery
 Rehabilitation
 Thoracic Surgery
 Urology Surgery
 Vascular Surgery
 Oncology
 Support and Therapy
 Diagnostics and Testing
 Clinics
 Extra Mural Programs
 Public Health Programs
 Veterans Health Services
 Other Services

See also
 List of hospitals in New Brunswick 
 Fredericton, New Brunswick

References

External links
 Dr. Everett Chalmers Regional Hospital - web site

Hospital buildings completed in 1976
Hospitals in New Brunswick
Teaching hospitals in Canada
Hospitals established in 1976
Buildings and structures in Fredericton
1976 establishments in New Brunswick